Immortal Collection 1983-1995 is a compilation album by Signal Aout 42, released in 1995 by Out of Line.

Reception
Aiding & Abetting recommended the anthology to listeners of The Sisters of Mercy and said "Seriously overdramatic techno collection" and "with obvious goth overtones melded into a hard techno groove (like a moodier FLA at times), Signal Aout 42 does much better when it focuses on music and doesn't whip out vocals." A critic at babysue commended the album and said "sounds nice, and is a bit poppier than you might think." Sonic Boom said "creative use of vocal samples and the lack of many keyboard presets are enough to keep this album from being too boring" and "the older material uses more strings and has a trance feel to it while the newer material is more percussion based and is better suited for club play."

Track listing

Personnel 
Adapted from the Immortal Collection 1983-1995 liner notes.

Signal Aout 42
 Bruno Van Garsse – producer
 Jacky Meurisse – executive-production, recording
 Michel Nachtergaele – producer

Production and design
  M.D.D.V. – design

Release history

References

External links 
 

1995 compilation albums
Signal Aout 42 albums
Fifth Colvmn Records compilation albums
Out of Line Music compilation albums